Wedoquella is a genus of South American jumping spiders that was first described by María Elena Galiano in 1984. The genus name is an arbitrary combination of letters with the suffix "-ella".

Species
 it contains five species, found in Paraguay, Bolivia, and Argentina:
Wedoquella apnnea Rubio, Nadal & Edwards, 2019 – Argentina
Wedoquella denticulata Galiano, 1984 (type) – Argentina
Wedoquella karadya Rubio, Baigorria & Edwards, 2019 – Argentina
Wedoquella macrothecata Galiano, 1984 – Argentina
Wedoquella punctata (Tullgren, 1905) – Bolivia, Paraguay, Argentina

References

External links
 Diagnostic drawings
 Photographs of Wedoquella species from Brazil

Salticidae
Salticidae genera
Spiders of South America